Yongcheng is county-level city in Henan province, China, and is the easternmost county-level division of the province, bordering Anhui province on all sides except the northwest and due north. Yongcheng has significant coal deposits and some insignificant magnet deposits. In 2014, Yongcheng was upgraded to a provincially directly administered city.

It is the former site of Shiyuan, the capital of Han-era Liang. It includes the excavated mausoleum of the fabulously wealthy Liu Wu, prince of Liang, now a museum famed for its murals.

Geography
Yongcheng is located in the Huai River Basin, in the easternmost part of Henan Province, with an average elevation of 33 meters. The Tuo hui River passes through the northern part of the western urban area and the southern part of the eastern urban area. The Mang Mountain is located in the northern Mangshan Town. The China National Highway 311 runs through the east and west, and the S32 Yongcheng–Dengfeng Expressway runs through the south.

Administrative divisions
As 2012, this city is divided to 11 towns and 18 townships.
Towns

Townships

Climate

References

External links
Official website of Yongcheng Government

Cities in Henan
Shangqiu